Scymnobius bivulnerus is a species of dusky lady beetle in the family Coccinellidae. It is found in North America.

References

 "The Coccinellidae (Coleoptera) of America North of Mexico", Robert D. Gordon. 1985. Journal of the New York Entomological Society, Vol. 93, No. 1.
 Gordon, Robert D. (1985). "The Coccinellidae (Coleoptera) of America North of Mexico". Journal of the New York Entomological Society, vol. 93, no. 1, 1–912.

Further reading

 Arnett, R.H. Jr., M. C. Thomas, P. E. Skelley and J. H. Frank. (eds.). (2002). American Beetles, Volume II: Polyphaga: Scarabaeoidea through Curculionoidea. CRC Press LLC, Boca Raton, FL.
 Arnett, Ross H. (2000). American Insects: A Handbook of the Insects of America North of Mexico. CRC Press.
 Richard E. White. (1983). Peterson Field Guides: Beetles. Houghton Mifflin Company.

Coccinellidae
Beetles described in 1895